The Grossglockner Races were hillclimbs for automobiles and motorcycles held in 1935, 1938 and 1939 on the Grossglockner High Alpine Road crossing the Central Eastern Alps in Austria.

History
Hillclimbs were held in Austria since about 1900 on courses in the Vienna Woods (Exelberg Race) and at Semmering Pass, as well as on the Gaisberg mountain road near Salzburg, a venue of the European Hill Climb Championship from 1929–30. When after five years of construction the Grossglockner High Alpine Road was opened in the year 1935 as a high-altitude scenic route crossing the main chain of the Alps between the Austrian states of Salzburg and Carinthia, the High Society of the Austrian motorsport gave a powerful demonstration of its presence, including Vice-Chancellor Ernst Rüdiger Starhemberg and chief engineer Franz Wallack. The first International Grossglockner Hillclimb took place on August 4, 1935, only one day after the official opening of the road. After the Austrian Anschluss to Nazi Germany, still two further races should follow in 1938 and 1939; they had been named according to the political development Großer Bergpreis von Deutschland (Hillclimb Grand Prix of Germany).

Races

1935
Despite political problems under austrofascist rule, many foreign racing drivers and riders participated in this first race 1935: With their automobiles came the Italian drivers Mario Tadini and Carlo Maria Pintacuda in Alfa Romeo 8C racers from the Scuderia Ferrari, as well as Renato Balestrero and Luigi Villoresi; from Switzerland came Hans Kessler, Max Christen and Christian Kautz; the Chilean driver Juan Zanelli in a National Pescara car from Spain, Bruno Sojka and the brothers George and Zdenek Pohl as well as engineer Proskowetz from Czechoslovakia; from England Richard Seaman, Thomas Clarkes, and female racing pioneer Eileen Ellison driving a Bugatti; from the Netherlands Cornelius and Herkuleyns; from Belgium Cocagne; from France Pierre Rey and Comte de Bremond; and finally from Hungary the drivers Wilheim and Delmar.
  
The Austrian participation with cars was small, from Germany had been come the mountain specialists Bobby Kohlrausch with his 750-cc-supercharged-MG, Rudolf Steinweg and Walter Bäumer. The very opposite situation with the motorcycle racer: there the Austrians placed the bulk with the mountain-experienced Martin Schneeweiss, Michael Gayer, Hermann Deimel and Otto Steinfellner leading the team, while only a few foreigners had entered for the motor cycle competition. From Switzerland had come the two NSU specialists Hans Stärkle with his wife in the sidecar and Hans Kaufmann, from Italy Radames Bianchi, from Hungary Gyula Patho and from Germany Schnitzelbaumer from Munich.
  
The race was started in Fusch, Salzburg.

The fastest motorcycle time completed by Martin Schneeweiss, who was not specialized yet at that time on speedway racing, likewise of Vienna, in the class over 500 cc. With his Austro Omega (600 cc JAP engine) he speeded up on the average of 76,5 km/h, which corresponded to a time of 15:17,57 min.  The side car class had been dominated by Hans Stärkle on NSU with an average speed of 70,8 km/h.
  
With automobiles succeeded the best sports car time to the Scudeira Ferrari driver Carlo Pintacuda, whose Alfa Romeo made an average speed of 76,7 km/h (15:15,69 min.), only scarcely two seconds faster than the fastest motor cycle racer. The highlight of the racing cars was the race of Mario Tadini, who shot up with his Alfa, likewise from the Scuderia Ferrari, in a time of 14:42,74 min. (79,58 km/h).
  
Despite the absence of, at that time at the focus of the general interest, Auto Union and Daimler Benz, the Großglockner Race 1935 was a brilliant event.

1938

The meetings followed in 1938 and 1939 indeed brought the large work race stables to the Grossglockner Road, but the atmosphere were strongly impaired by bad weather conditions. Also the numbers of entries remained in a modest scale. Hill climb race champion Hans Stuck on  Auto Union, Hermann Lang on Mercedes and Manfred von Brauchitsch participated with their automobiles, Ewald Kluge on DKW, Leonhard Fassl on NSU lined up at the start beside many other participants of the first race from 1935.

The Austrians were steely-eyed during the Glockner race in 1938 as a blue automobile, a perfectly ordinary touring car never seen there before, hummed happily up the Grossglockner
race course. The loudspeakers made it known that this vehicle required 21:54,4
minutes for the 12,5 km course and achieved an average of 34,5 km per hour.
Utterly without boiling over or adding cooling water. There was a famous man at
the wheel: Prof. Ferdinand Porsche, and the automobile – the “KdF car”,
Germany's Volkswagen!

Prof. Ferdinand Porsche, who ran a construction office in Stuttgart, constructed this Volkswagen on commission to the German government of the day. Prof. Porsche was then forced during the Second World War to move his factory to Gmünd in Carinthia. The first Porsche models were made there after the war. When the factory again returned to Stuttgart, he also founded the oldest Porsche workshop in Austria, the Porsche in the Alpenstraße in
Salzburg. Prof. Porsche also constructed the Auto Union type C racing car,
which with about 520 horse power dominated the races in the mid-1930s. This
racing car was also used in the three Glockner races.

Grossglockner on August 26, 1938. The field of participants was not very large – motor-sport was simply very expensive! Sepp Hofmann from Salzburg on a private BMW 500 R 51 SS provided one of the two sensations among motorcycle-racing participants in the second Grossglockner race.

The first was that Ewald Kluge (Germany) rode in the worst possible weather the best motorcycle time of 68,46 km per hour and thus became the “German Hill Climb Champion”. And that with only a 250cc DKW racing motorcycle! It should be mentioned that the “German Hill Climb Champion” title was given to the rider achieving the best overall time, independent of the racing class. Kluge rode up the mountain in an overall time (two heats) of 22:05,2 minutes. The second sensation was that the private rider, Sepp Hofmann, with an overall time of 24:38,2 minutes, won in the half-litre class ahead of the DKW works rider, Bungerz.

The course length in 1938 was 12,5 km; one drove twice from the Ferleitentoll gate to the Fuscher Törl. As the winner of the 350cc class, brand colleague Sissi Wünsche (Germany), achieved a time of only 23:12,1 minutes. This was because bad weather hindered fast riding during the event. The newly minted European dirt-track champion, Martin Schneeweiss from Vienna, Austria, disappointed the spectators. He had been taken into the BMW works team that year, but could not get along with the supercharged boxer. He already had “dismounted” in the Grand Prix of Germany in Hohenstein, which also happened to him on the Grossglockner.

Hans Stuck became the “German Hill Climb Champion” in an Auto Union with an overall time of 20:10 minutes (74,67 km per hour) ahead of Hermann Lang and Manfred von Brauchitsch (both in Mercedes Benz).

1939

The course on the north side of the Glockner Massif with a maximum gradient of 12% covers an altitude difference of 1.285m. But because the start itself was at 1.145 m, and the highest point at 2.400 m, a worsening of engine performance became evident due to the thin air. And then with bad and constantly changing weather the race technicians were really put through their paces. In respect of weather, the Grossglockner is unfortunately by no means timid. Sun, rain or fog can alternate often within minutes. Thus the third and last event on the mountain, on August 6, 1939, suffered severely under this capriciousness.

During training, in dry weather, Hans Stuck drove in an Auto Union and at 8:59,6 minutes set a new record (84,7 km per hour). Among the motorcycles it was always the DKW racing motorcycles that achieved the fasted training times.

On the day of the race the Grossglockner showed itself in its worst mood. Following grey thunderstorms in the morning, the loveliest high-summer weather prevailed at noon, but at the start of the race this turned into rain and fog. The fog was so thick that visibility was hardly 20 metres. The average speed then also told the tale all too clearly: Martin Schneeweiss (DKW), winner of the 250cc class - 63,04 km per hour – even beating the DKW works rider Walfried Winkler; Leonhard Faßl (NSU), winner of the 350cc class - 62,87 km per hour; Georg Mittenwald (DKW), winner of the 500cc class - 66.85 km per hour, the best sportscar time was driven by Polensky from Berlin in a BMW (67,45 km per hour), among the racing cars it was Hermann Lang in a Mercedes Benz with 75,09 km per hour, who as overall winner became the German Hill Climb Champion. Hans Stuck in an Auto Union achieved second place with 74,88 km per hour.

The Second World War broke out a little later and the Grossglockner never again was conquered in race speed.

International Six Days' Trial

The International Six Days Trial featured time checkpoints on its events on the Grossglockner when in this part of Europe. Most famously was the ISDT of 1939 which was brought to an unceremonious end by the declaration of World War 2 that had caused a number of allied nations, in order to pre-empt the problem, had an early retirement from the event. Later the FIM annulled the result of that event which the host nation Germany won.

Post-war

Today the regular traffic has become too much dense than one could close this road for a weekend. Also the safety requirements would not have to be brought in harmony with the conditions to be found along the road.

But the great competitions taken place at this famous race course should not fall into oblivion. As early as 1985, on the occasion of the fiftieth anniversary of the existence of the road, it came again to a meeting of motor sport enthusiasts at the Grossglockner:  about 100 automobiles and motorcycles from the time  before 1940 ago met there. For example, Hans Hermann with the Mercedes W 196, Silver arrow, joined the meeting. And of course Professor Dr. Helmut Krackowizer came and was highly pleased about reviving of an old past time - despite the bad weather conditions.

Since 2002 there had been a regularity race for historical racing motorcycles up to vintage 1961 in memoriam Prof. Dr. Helmut Krackowizer who died in 2001, the "Grossglockner Trophy Memorial Prof. Dr. Helmut Krackowizer". It took place every two years for three times (2002, 2004 and 2006).

The Grossglockner 2012 Grand Prix took place in September 2012.

Sources 
all sources are written in German
 Salzburgwiki Race 1935, with articles in newspapers and magazines with internetlink to ANNO - digitized newspapers and magazines from the Austrian National Library 
 Salzburgwiki Race 1938, with articles in newspapers and magazines with internetlink to ANNO - digitized newspapers and magazines from the Austrian National Library 
 Salzburgwiki Race 1939, with articles in newspapers and magazines with internetlink to ANNO - digitized newspapers and magazines from the Austrian National Library

References

External links
Grossglockner Trophy
The Austrian Motorcycle Literature and Picture Archives Prof. Dr. Helmut Krackowizer

Hillclimbs
Auto races in Austria